The Bimal Resistance also known as Bimal revolt, Bimal resistance or Merca revolt was a guerrilla war against the Italian Somaliland in southern Somalia. Named after the Bimal clan since they were the major element in the resistance. It was fought from the years 1888 to 1924 and largely concentrated in the Lower Shebelle, Banadir and Middle Shebelle. It is compared to the war of the Mad Mullah in Somaliland.

History 

In the 1890s Italy occupied Marka, the centre of the Bimal culture. This sparked the beginning of conflict and outrage among the Bimal clan, many of whom joined the Bimal resistance against Italy. An Italian resident of the city was assassinated in 1904, his name was Giacomo Trevis. In response Italy occupied the port town of Jazira about 30 miles south of Mogadishu. In response Bimal leaders called for a grand conference mobilizing the Banadiri clans. The resistance was spearheaded by Sheikh Abdi Gafle and Ma’alin Mursal Abdi Yusuf; two prominent local Islamic teachers in Marka from the Bimal clan. The resistance, albeit initially clan-based, transformed into one with a religious fervour, mainly Bimal (but also later on some of the Wa’dan,  Hintire and other clans of the Geledi confederation joined). This was to resist against the Italian advance and the decision to isolate the ports from trade with the interior.  The Qur’anic school teachers, or as they are called in Somali ma'alims, and religious leaders or imams of Marka and the Bimal led the war of resistance against the colonial occupation of Banadir, but they and their followers paid dearly.

A local poet who attacked those who refused to take up arms said:

- "Reer Jannah waa jid galeen, Reer Jahanamna iska jooga"

Those who resist are heaven bound, those who submit can stay home in Hell where they belong.

Leaders
Italian garrisons in both Marka and Jazira were under siege and barely survived. Though Italy sent support troops, they suffered considerable losses. In February 1907, at Turunley, also known as Dhanane, north of Marka, some 2,000 Banadiri warriors, led by Sheikh Abdi Abiikar Gaafle a religious Bimaal leader and Imam fought 1000 Italian troops, assisted by some 1,500 Arab, Eritrean, and Somali mercenaries led by Lieutenant Gustavo Pesenti. The attack started after midnight, February 9, 1907 and lasted to the noon of the 10th. The Banadiri warriors retreated, leaving behind several hundred dead and as many wounded. Although the Italians had high casualties, they considered Turunley a major military victory, one which Lieutenant Pesenti, the commander of the regiment, celebrated in an eyewitness account, Danane (Dhanane). On July 1908, at Finlow, the Bimal avenged Turunley defeating some 500 Italian troops. However, by 1908, major centers such as Afgoy capitulated to the Italians. However, the Italian conquest was not complete, and from 1910 to the 1920s, under the leadership of Sheikh Abdi Abikar Gaafle, the Banadiri coalition remained the leading opponent of Italian rule in the Riverine region.

Other Benadir resistance leaders included  Malaakh Cabdi Juray and Bilow Ageede.

Perception
One of the Italian`s greatest fears was the spread of 'Dervishism' ( had come to mean revolt) in the south and the strong Bimaal tribe of Benadir whom already were at war with the Italians, while not following the religious message or adhering to the views of Muhammad Abdullah Hassan, understood greatly his goal and political tactics. The dervishes, in this case, were engaged in supplying arms to the Bimaal.

The Italians wanted to bring in an end to the Bimaal revolt and at all cost prevent a Bimal-Dervish alliance, which lead them to use the forces of Obbia as prevention.

Italian garrisons in Marka barely survived the harassments and skirmishes and reinforcements from Mogadishu suffered considerable loses. This noble resistance caught the attention of Mohamed Abdulle Hassan, the charismatic Darawiish leader — who sent a lengthy message to the Bimal (Risaalat lil-Bimaal) in which he commended their efforts and proclaimed the necessity of waging Jihad against the colonial invaders. He attached a supplemental text entitled “Qam’ al-Mu’anidin” (Suppression of the Rebellious) that clarified the tenets of Saalihiya order, for which the leader ascribed to.

Letter
In his letter or risala lil-bimal Muhammad Abdulle Hassan praised the Bimal and tried to persuade the Bimal to join his Dervish movement. His letter to the Bimal was documented as the most extended exposition of his mind as a Muslim thinker and religious figure. The letter is til this day still preserved. It is said that the Bimal, thanks to their numerically powerful size, traditionally and religiously devoted fierce warriors and possession of much resources, intrigued Mahamed Abdulle Hassan. But not only that, the Bimal themselves had mounted an extensive and major resistance against the Italians, especially in the first decade of the 19th century. The Italians carried many expeditions against the powerful Bimal to try and pacify them. Because of this, the Bimal had all the reason to join the Dervish struggle. So, to win their support over, the Sayyid wrote a detailed theological statement to present to the Bimal tribe, who dominated the strategic Banaadir port of Merca and its surroundings.

References 

Italian Somaliland
1920s in Somalia
Military operations involving Italy
African resistance to colonialism